Osamu Miyazaki (born 23 January 1966) is a Japanese former professional Grand Prix motorcycle road racer. He was the first full-time rider in the championship from Japan. After winning his first race in the All Japan Road Race Championship at age 26, Miyazaki joined Aprilia and moved to Italy in 1996 to compete in the Grand Prix. After riding with Aprilla for three seasons, he raced with Yamaha, and helped them with the development of the TZ 250 and YZF-R6. In 2002, he won the Japanese Grand Prix. He left the Grand Prix circuit in 2004 to race in the All Japan Road Race Championship, retiring after the 2011 season.

Motorcycling career
Miyazaki started racing when he was 23, when he entered the All Japan Road Race Championship riding 250 cc motorcycles, and won his first race in the championship three seasons later. At that time, he migrated to the Grand Prix, initially competing in the 1991 Japanese race. He subsequently entered the race the following year, coming thirteenth overall. Following this success, he joined the Italian Aprilia team, which at the time was not well known in Japan. He achieved his first points in 1995. He moved to Italy to race in the Grand Prix professionally, the second Japanese rider at the Championships and the first Japanese contender to participate full-time.

He achieved his first win at the 2002 Japanese motorcycle Grand Prix at Suzuka while racing with Motorex Daytona Yamaha. He started at eighth place and finishing almost ten seconds ahead of the next competitor. He entered as a Japanese wildcard.

In 2004, he moved to racing 600 cc motorcycles in the All Japan Road Race Championships. After four years, he had achieved second place at the end of the season. He started his own team in 2008 and took pole position the following year in the third round at Autopolis, but suffered a serious injury at the end of the season. He subsequently raced in 2010 and 2011, retiring shortly afterwards.

Legacy
Miyazaki was involved in the development of the Yamaha TZ 250 and Yamaha YZF-R6. He worked with Dunlop Tyres in tyre R&D in 2004 and coached Chinese competitors in 2009.

Career statistics

Grand Prix motorcycle racing

Races by year
(key) (Races in bold indicate pole position)

References

1966 births
250cc World Championship riders
Japanese motorcycle racers
Kawasaki Motors Racing MotoGP riders
Living people
People from Yamaguchi (city)